An earthquake struck the Department of Lima, Peru on May 12, 2022.  The earthquake caused minor damage and some casualties in the Lima area. Several homes collapsed due to the earthquake.

Tectonic setting
Earthquakes in Peru occur as the result of shallow thrust faulting about 100 km east of the Peru-Chile Trench and on the subduction zone interface between the Nazca and South American plates. At the location of the earthquake, the two plates converge at a velocity of about 77 mm/yr, with the South American plate moving up and seaward over the Nazca plate. The earthquake location, depth, and focal mechanism solutions indicate that the source of the earthquake was likely along the interface between the two plates.

Coastal Peru has a history of very large earthquakes. The May 2022 event originated just northwest of the source region of the Lima earthquake of October 1974 and just north of the source regions of major earthquakes that occurred in August 1942 and November 1996. The largest coastal Peru earthquake of the last two centuries was the magnitude 8.5-9.3 earthquake of 1868, which was centered southeast of the May 12th earthquake. The 1868 event produced a tsunami that resulted in 25,000 fatalities along the South America coast and also caused damage in Hawaii.

Earthquake

The earthquake occurred southeast of the Peruvian capital Lima. It was centred 11 km northwest of San Bartolo. The earthquake had a maximum MMI of VII (Very strong) in San Bartolo, and an intensity of V (Moderate) in Lima.

Other events
Four months prior to the May event, a magnitude 5.6 earthquake struck the same area. This earthquake caused 39 injuries, destroyed twelve homes and caused rockslides in the Lima area.

Impact
Minor damage occurred mainly in Lima. Four adobe houses collapsed, and seventeen others were damaged. One of these collapsing homes injured three people in Huaral, all over the age of 50. Three young children were injured and a 16-year old girl fell from the third floor of her home. In total, eleven people were injured. A four-year old child in Lima was injured and later died at the hospital after falling off a building during the quake, and an 84-year old woman died of a heart attack. A coastal highway in Costa Verde suffered landslides from the ravines that guard it, which caused occasional closures of the road.

See also

List of earthquakes in 2022
List of earthquakes in Peru
2007 Peru earthquake
2021 Mala earthquake -  5.9 deadly earthquake that also impacted the Lima area.

References

C
Earthquakes in Peru  
2022 in Peru
May 2022 events in South America
2022 disasters in Peru